NGC 3884 is a spiral galaxy located about 330 million light-years away in the constellation Leo. The galaxy was discovered by astronomer William Herschel on April 27, 1785 and is a member of the Leo Cluster.

Although it is classified as a LINER galaxy, NGC 3884 is also classified as a type 1 Seyfert galaxy.

On February 23, 2018, a type Ic supernova designated as SN 2018yn was discovered in NGC 3884.

References

External links
 

3884
36706
Leo (constellation)
Leo Cluster
Astronomical objects discovered in 1785
Unbarred spiral galaxies
Seyfert galaxies
LINER galaxies
6746